Christopher Paul Pascoe (born 26 April 1966) is an English author of humorous books.

His first two books 'A Cat Called Birmingham' (Hodder & Stoughton 2005) and 'You Can Take the Cat Out of Slough' (Hodder & Stoughton 2007)  tell the story of a disaster prone cat named Birmingham. A Cat Called Birmingham has since been translated into French and Chinese. In France, the book is titled 'Monsieur Chatastrophe'.  The book caused controversy in Birmingham because it was seen as a slur on the city by a London-based author You Can Take the Cat Out of Slough has also been released in France (October 2009), titled 'Le Journal de Monsieur Chatastrophe' . A Cat Called Birmingham & You Can Take the Cat Out of Slough have featured in Kindle's Top Ten Cat books, and A Cat Called Birmingham is now in its 10th UK edition. You Can Take the Cat Out of Slough was re-released in paperback in 2015.

In 2009, Pascoe signed with Anova, and 'Death Destruction and a Packet of Peanuts', a humorous factual/historical tour of the English Civil War battlefields and their pubs, was released on Anova's Portico imprint in July 2010. Confessions of a Cat Sitter, based on the popular long-running Your Cat Magazine series, was released in January 2016. 'The World's Daftest Rabbit', a collection of his My Weekly magazine columns, was released by My Weekly in September 2017, and 'The World's Craziest Cats' in September 2018.

Chris Pascoe is now a writer with various UK and US magazines, and is a columnist for the UK national magazines My Weekly and Your Cat.

References

External links
Official homepage
 Profile
 Miacis

1966 births
British humorists
Living people